In theoretical physics, quantum geometry is the set of mathematical concepts generalizing the concepts of geometry whose understanding is necessary to describe the physical phenomena at distance scales comparable to the Planck length. At these distances, quantum mechanics has a profound effect on physical phenomena.

Quantum gravity

Each theory of quantum gravity uses the term "quantum geometry" in a slightly different fashion. String theory, a leading candidate for a quantum theory of gravity, uses the term quantum geometry to describe exotic phenomena such as T-duality and other geometric dualities, mirror symmetry, topology-changing transitions, minimal possible distance scale, and other effects that challenge intuition. More technically, quantum geometry refers to the shape of a spacetime manifold as experienced by D-branes which includes quantum corrections to the metric tensor, such as the worldsheet instantons. For example, the quantum volume of a cycle is computed from the mass of a brane wrapped on this cycle.

In an alternative approach to quantum gravity called loop quantum gravity (LQG), the phrase "quantum geometry" usually refers to the formalism within LQG where the observables that capture the information about the geometry are now well defined operators on a Hilbert space. In particular, certain physical observables, such as the area, have a discrete spectrum. It has also been shown that the loop quantum geometry is non-commutative.

It is possible (but considered unlikely) that this strictly quantized understanding of geometry will be consistent with the quantum picture of geometry arising from string theory.

Another, quite successful, approach, which tries to reconstruct the geometry of space-time from "first principles" is Discrete Lorentzian quantum gravity.

Quantum states as differential forms

Differential forms are used to express quantum states, using the wedge product:

where the position vector is

the differential volume element is

The overlap integral is given by:

in differential form this is

The probability of finding the particle in some region of space  is given by the integral over that region:

provided the wave function is normalized. When  is all of 3d position space, the integral must be  if the particle exists.

Differential forms are an approach for describing the geometry of curves and surfaces in a coordinate independent way. In quantum mechanics, idealized situations occur in rectangular Cartesian coordinates, such as the potential well, particle in a box, quantum harmonic oscillator, and more realistic approximations in spherical polar coordinates such as electrons in atoms and molecules. For generality, a formalism which can be used in any coordinate system is useful.

See also
 Noncommutative geometry

References

Further reading

 Supersymmetry, Demystified, P. Labelle, McGraw-Hill (USA), 2010, 
 Quantum Mechanics, E. Abers, Pearson Ed., Addison Wesley, Prentice Hall Inc, 2004, 
 Quantum Mechanics Demystified, D. McMahon, Mc Graw Hill (USA), 2006, 
 Quantum Field Theory, D. McMahon, Mc Graw Hill (USA), 2008,

External links
Space and Time: From Antiquity to Einstein and Beyond
Quantum Geometry and its Applications

Quantum gravity
Quantum mechanics
Mathematical physics